Babinet is a surname. Notable people with the surname include:

 Gilles Babinet (born 1967), French entrepreneur
 Jacques Babinet (1794–1872), French scientist
 Rémi Babinet (born 1957), French creative director

Other uses
 Babinet–Soleil compensator
 Babinet's principle, physics theorem